The 1997 Masaryk Grand Prix was the third round of the 1997 International Sports Racing Series season.  It took place at the Masaryk Circuit, Czech Republic, on September 14, 1997.

Official results
Class winners in bold.

External links
 World Sports Racing Prototypes - Results

B
6 Hours of Brno
International Sports Racing Series Brno